Daniel Boys (born 26 March 1979) is an English musical theatre actor, who was a contestant on the BBC talent series Any Dream Will Do in 2007 before becoming known as a stage actor in various musicals including Avenue Q, Spamalot and Falsettos.

Early life and education
Boys was born at Yateley, Hampshire, the son of a chartered surveyor and a phlebotomist. He won a Cameron Mackintosh scholarship to study at the Guildford School of Acting, where he graduated with a BA (Honours) in 2001.

Career
Boys was selected to perform in the first UK tour of Jonathan Larson's Rent, which meant leaving college early. He understudied the characters of Mark (played by Adam Rickitt) and Angel, eventually taking over the role of Mark, performing on alternate nights at the Prince of Wales Theatre in London's West End. In 2002, he played Morino in the UK tour of Sunset Boulevard, which starred Faith Brown. Boys also appeared as Roger, one of the T-birds, in Grease at the Victoria Palace. He also went on the touring production to Japan, and playing the role of Doody in Scandinavia and Cyprus. Daniel was also a soloist in Disney's Enchanted Evening (a series of UK concerts in 2004), of which the final concert was televised on BBC1 as the BBC Family Prom in the Park.

In 2005, Boys took part in BBC London's Children in Need – The Musical. He also performed at Party in the Park with the company of Grease. Guest TV appearances with Grease also included Blue Peter and The Graham Norton Show. His other early theatre credits include; Austin in I Love You Because (Landor in 2007), Anthony in Sweeney Todd (Royal Festival Hall in 2007), Mark in Rent (European Tour in 2006) and Parson Nathaniel (u/s) in Jeff Wayne's The War of the Worlds (National Tour in 2007). He also understudied all male roles. He can be seen on the live tour DVD special features, performing in place of Russell Watson in the dress rehearsal.

Any Dream Will Do 
In 2007, he participated in the BBC reality show Any Dream Will Do. On 19 May he was the 7th contestant to be eliminated from the series. During the series, the judges tested his vocal skills on a wide variety of music genres including rock, swing, ballads, and pop. His only opportunity to sing a musical theatre number was during a sing-off, in which he performed "Bring Him Home" from Les Misérables against Lewis Bradley. Daniel received the fewest votes, and was chosen to leave the show by Andrew Lloyd Webber.

In July 2007, Boys then appeared as Anthony Hope in Stephen Sondheim's Sweeney Todd: The Demon Barber of Fleet Street which was one of the first shows to open at the newly restored Royal Festival Hall.

In late 2008, Daniel joined the cast of the hit show Avenue Q. For over two years, Daniel played the lead roles of Princeton and Rod. He won the "What's on Stage Theatregoers Choice Award" for "Best Takeover in a Role" for his performance.

Career After Any Dream Will Do
In late 2008, Daniel joined the cast of the hit show Avenue Q. For over two years, Daniel played the lead roles of Princeton and Rod. He won the "What's on Stage Theatregoers Choice Award" for "Best Takeover in a Role" for his performance. On 14 September 2008, Boys performed at Andrew Lloyd Webber's 60th birthday concert in Hyde Park, singing "A Light at the End of the Tunnel" alongside other finalists from the TV series "Any Dream will Do" and "I'd Do Anything". The concert was later broadcast by the BBC on Radio 2.

He also appeared on the BBC programme "Songs of Praise" on 11 January 2009, performing the song "You Know Better than I" from the animated musical "Joseph – King of Dreams". In May 2009 (culminating in a performance at the Royal Albert Hall on 1 June 2009) Later in 2009, he then toured with John Barrowman on his Music Music Music tour, singing some solo material from his debut album and a duet with John Barrowman, "I Know Him So Well". On 6 December 2009, Boys performed with fellow artists in "Christmas in New York" at the Prince of Wales Theatre. Among his songs were "Ave Maria" and "Winter Wonderland". In 2009 Daniel's debut solo album So Close was released. To coincide with the release, Daniel embarked on a series of solo concerts performing at venues such as Leicester Square Theatre, the Delfont Room in the Prince of Wales Theatre, Wilton Music Hall, Greenwich Theatre and three sold-out performances at Pizza on the Park (Jazz Club), London. 
He made his American debut with the show when he performed at Show at Barre (Los Angeles), supported by Broadway actress Megan Hilty, and in Australia he played at both Sydney and the Adelaide Cabaret Festival alongside acts such as Olivia Newton-John and Chita Rivera.

In February 2010, Boys performed with Jessie Buckley in two concerts in Manchester and Birmingham entitled "Valentines at the Musicals" including songs from West Side Story and My Fair Lady. He then performed as Eddie in the workshop production of Painted Lady: The Princess Caraboo Scandal (Bristol Old Vic/Finborough), then as Christian in the London premiere of Wolfboy at Trafalgar Studios.

In 2011, he was Jason in Ordinary Days (Trafalgar Studios), also as Doug in the workshop of The Trouble with Doug (Northampton Royal & Derngate). In July, he performed the title role in a new musical version of Peter Pan, first playing at the Grand Canal Theatre, Dublin over the summer and then at the Mayflower Theatre, Southampton, for the Christmas period. On 21 October 2011, Boys played Judas in the 40th anniversary production of Godspell alongside Kerry Ellis at the Palace Theatre, Manchester.

On 6 May 2012, he was one of the headline performers in "The Night of 1000 Voices" at the Royal Albert Hall. and then completed a run as Algernon in a new musical version of The Importance of Being Earnest at the Theatre Royal, Windsor. In September 2012 he was a guest on Radio 2's Friday Night is Music Night which was recorded live at LSO St Lukes, London. He made a short film with David Paisley entitled Fall-Out about two ex-partners who end up in a fallout shelter together, which went round the 2012 festival circuit.

In February 2013, Network Ten and FremantleMedia Australia announced that they were searching across Australia and the United Kingdom for a singer to record a new version of the theme tune for Neighbours The competition resulted in a tie and the new theme is sung as a duet by Daniel and Stephanie Angelini. The new version of the theme tune began airing from 15 April 2013. In July 2013 he joined High Society UK touring cast, playing Mike Connor.

In March 2014, Boys joined the West End production of Spamalot at the Playhouse Theatre as Sir Lancelot. He also appeared in West End Recast, a one-off concert at the Duke of York's Theatre.

On 31 March 2015, he appeared on Holby City on BBC 1 as 'Josh Harrison'.

In January 2016, it was announced he will appear in the new musical comedy Miss Atomic Bomb in the St James's Theatre alongside TV and theatre star Catherine Tate. In October 2016 he starred as Donald in a production of The Boys in the Band, by Mart Crowley at the Park Theatre, with co-stars including Mark Gatiss, James Holmes, Ben Mansfield and Jack Derges.

In May 2017. he was cast as teacher 'Paul Maddens' (main lead) in Nativity! The Musical at Birmingham Repertory Theatre. Boys later played another teacher, Mr. Johnson, in the fourth film in the Nativity series, Nativity Rocks! in 2018. In August 2017 Boys starred alongside Helena Blackman and Sherman Brothers' musical scion, composer Robert J. Sherman in A Spoonful of Sherman at "Live At Zedel" in London.

At the beginning of 2018, Boys performed for two months in the Theatre Clywd production of Little Shop of Horrors, starring as Seymour. After starring in Nativity Rocks!, Boys appeared in the World Premiere of Love Story at the Bolton Octagon, starring as Dan.

He was cast as Joseph Kirby in ITV's Endeavour in January 2019. In May 2019 it was announced that Boys would lead the UK Premiere cast of Falsettos at The Other Palace in London's Off-West End. He played the role of Marvin until the show closed in January 2020.

Boys performed in a concert performance of Alain Boublil & Claude-Michel Schönberg's The Pirate Queen on the 23 February 2020 at the London Coliseum in aid of Leukaemia UK.

Recordings
In 2008, Boys recorded a song for the CD Act One – Songs From The Musicals Of Alexander S. Bermange, an album of 20 brand new recordings by 26 West End stars, released in October 2008 on Dress Circle Records.

His debut album So Close launched on 1 June 2009. It was mixed by Grammy award-winner (and cousin) Jerry Boys in early 2009. The penultimate track Always There features the backing vocals of friends and cast members (from Avenue Q).

Boys also recorded the song My Brother's Eyes on Terry Pratchett's Only You Can Save Mankind, which was released on 23 November 2009, and recorded a version of I Know Him So Well with John Barrowman for his 2008 album Music Music Music.

In 2011 he recorded a charity single with proceeds going to the Disney Appeal at Great Ormond Street Hospital, called The World is Something You Can Imagine. Boys also appeared on the cast recording of Wolfboy, More With Every Line – the Songs of Tim Prottey-Jones, Only You Can Save Mankind, The Inbetween: A New Musical (in 2012) and Christmas in New York. He has also contributed to Helena Blackman's debut album.

On 6. November 2018 AGR Television Records announced that Daniel Boys had signed a multi-album record deal with them. The first release under the new contract was Christmas Lullaby later the same month. An album was announced for 2019.

Film and theatre

Filmography

Theatre credits

Discography 
 So Close (2009)

Personal life

He has revealed in several interviews that he is gay. He said 

He has been in a relationship with actor Chris Jenkins since 2014.

References

External links 

 Official Daniel Boys website
 AGR Television Records Record Label of David Boys (multi-lingual)
 

Alumni of the Guildford School of Acting
English male musical theatre actors
English male singers
1979 births
Living people
English gay actors
English gay musicians
People educated at Salesian College, Farnborough
Male actors from Hampshire
20th-century English LGBT people
21st-century English LGBT people
English LGBT actors
English LGBT musicians
British LGBT singers